Strange Affair is a 1981 French drama film directed by Pierre Granier-Deferre, and starring Michel Piccoli, Gérard Lanvin and Nathalie Baye.

Novel 
The story was adapted from the novel of Jean-Marc Roberts Affaires étrangères, which won in 1979 the Prix Renaudot.

Plot 
Louis Coline (Gérard Lanvin) is an executive assistant in a declining Paris department store. While he is not ambitious and has little to do, he is content with his wife Nina (Nathalie Baye), visits to his mother and grandmother and nights out with his friends playing poker. However, the manipulative Bertrand Malair (Michel Piccoli) becomes the store's new manager, and arrives to shake up the company. Louis fears for his job, but Bertrand draws him into his inner circle of confidants. Bertrand starts to control Louis' life, while Louis is afraid of losing his privileged position. To maintain it Louis works overtime, accepts Bertrand's invitations to nightclubs and dinners with an androgynous woman, and places his house at Bertrand's disposal. Nina sees through her husband's behaviour and objects, but Louis cannot refuse Bertrand's demands, and she is unable to make him see how much his personality has changed. Desperate, she leaves her husband, which only draws him further under Bertrand's control. Bertrand soon disappears as mysteriously as he came, and Louis finds himself unable to revert to his previous self.

Cast
 Michel Piccoli as Bertrand Malair
 Gérard Lanvin as Louis Coline
 Nathalie Baye as Nina Coline
 Jean-Pierre Kalfon as François Lingre
 Jean-François Balmer as Paul Belais
 Pierre Michael as Gérard Doutre
 Madeleine Cheminat as Yvette
 Jacques Boudet as M. Blain
 Victor Garrivier as Le père de Nina
 Dominique Blanchar as La mère de Louis
 Ariane Lartéguy as Salomé
 Nicolas Vogel as René
 Dominique Zardi as Gruault, chef des contentieux

Awards
The film won the Louis Delluc Prize and the César Award for Best Actress in a Supporting Role, and it received César nominations for best actor, best supporting actor, best director and best writing. Michel Piccoli won the Silver Bear for Best Actor at the 32nd Berlin International Film Festival.

References

External links 
 
 

1981 films
French drama films
1980s French-language films
1981 drama films
1980s business films
Louis Delluc Prize winners
Films directed by Pierre Granier-Deferre
Films scored by Philippe Sarde
1980s French films